Ohio is a community in the Canadian province of Nova Scotia, located in the District of Clare in Digby County.

See also
Ohio, Antigonish County, in Antigonish County
Ohio, Yarmouth, Nova Scotia, in Yarmouth County

References
Ohio on Destination Nova Scotia

Communities in Digby County, Nova Scotia
General Service Areas in Nova Scotia